Mizuno is a Japanese sportswear and sports equipment manufacturer.

Mizuno may also refer to:

 Mizuno (surname)
 4541 Mizuno, a minor-planet moon named after Yoshikane Mizuno